The Porte Saint-Denis is a Parisian monument located in the 10th arrondissement, at the site of one of the gates of the Wall of Charles V, one of Paris' former city walls. It is located at the crossing of the Rue Saint-Denis continued by the Rue du Faubourg Saint-Denis, with the Boulevard de Bonne-Nouvelle and the Boulevard Saint-Denis.

History 

The Porte Saint-Denis was originally a gateway through the Wall of Charles V that was built between 1356 and 1383 to protect the Right Bank of Paris. The medieval fortification had two gates and was surmounted with four towers. Additional portcullises defended the outer gate along with a drawbridge and rock-cut ditch. However, with the advent of gunpowder and the development of cannons and bombards, the walls were eventually partly torn down in the 1640s to make way for the larger and more fortified Louis XIII Wall. In the 1670s, the remaining walls of Charles V were entirely demolished when Paris spread beyond the confines of its medieval boundaries.

To replace the old gateway of Porte Saint-Denis, Louis XIV commanded architect François Blondel and the sculptor Michel Anguier to build him a monumental archway that would honor the capture of Franche-Comté in 1668 and the victories on the Rhine during the Franco-Dutch War. Work began in 1672 and was paid for by the city of Paris.

A monument defining the official art of its epoque, the Porte Saint-Denis provided the subject of the engraved frontispiece to Blondel's influential Cours d'architecture, 1698. It was restored in 1988.

The Porte Saint-Denis was the first of four triumphal arches to be built in Paris. The three others are the Arc de Triomphe du Carrousel (1806-1808), Porte Saint-Martin (1674), and Arc de Triomphe (1836).

Description 
The Porte Saint-Denis is a triumphal arch inspired by the Arch of Titus in Rome.

The main arch is flanked by obelisks applied to the wall face bearing sculptural groups of trophies of arms.  Above the main arch, the southern face carries a sculptural group by Michel Anguier of "The Passage of the Rhine" in a sunk panel, while the north face carries allegorical figures of the Rhine and the Netherlands.  The entablature bears the gilded bronze inscription LUDOVICO MAGNO, "To Louis the Great". Two smaller pedestrian walkways were built through the obelisk pedestals but they have now been closed.

Gallery 
The arch is decorated with a variety of sculptures and friezes

Access

See also 
 List of post-Roman triumphal arches

Notes

External links 

 Insecula - Porte Saint-Denis 

Terminating vistas in Paris
Triumphal arches in France
Monuments and memorials in Paris
Buildings and structures completed in 1672
Saint-Denis
Buildings and structures in the 10th arrondissement of Paris
1672 establishments in France